José Antonio de la Vega Asmitia (born 16 June 1963) is a Mexican lawyer and politician affiliated with the National Action Party. As of 2014 he served as Deputy of the LIX Legislature of the Mexican Congress as a plurinominal representative.

References

1963 births
Living people
Politicians from Tabasco
20th-century Mexican lawyers
Members of the Chamber of Deputies (Mexico)
National Action Party (Mexico) politicians
Universidad Juárez Autónoma de Tabasco alumni
Deputies of the LIX Legislature of Mexico